Interferon-induced GTP-binding protein Mx1 is a protein that in humans is encoded by the MX1 gene.

In mice, the interferon-inducible Mx protein is responsible for a specific antiviral state against influenza virus infection. Furthermore, the human orthologue MxA is a major determinant for influenza viruses of animal origin. The protein encoded by this gene is similar to the mouse protein as determined by its antigenic relatedness, induction conditions, physicochemical properties, and amino acid analysis. This cytoplasmic protein is a member of both the dynamin superfamily and the family of large GTPases.

References

Further reading